The Seabrook Buddhist Temple is a Buddhist temple of the Jōdo Shinshū Hongwanji-ha  sect  in the Seabrook section of Upper Deerfield Township, New Jersey. It is an affiliate of the Buddhist Churches of America.

History

Establishment
Between 1944 and 1947, during the US Government relocation program, about 500 Japanese families had been living and working at Seabrook Farms. In response to the community's spiritual concerns, Shosetsu Tsufara and Zaishin Mukushina began holding non-denominational Buddhist services. The Buddhist church was formed in the winter of 1945 and Kaoru Kamikawa was selected as president of the organization. 

In 1946, the Seabrook chapter of the Young Buddhist Association was formed with Kiyomi Nakamura as its chairperson.

By 1965, the Seabrook Buddhist Sangha was officially recognized as an independent temple. On October 6, 1966, members of the congregation planned for the construction of an independent church building and purchased more than 7 acres of land. 

In 1968, the groundbreaking of the current temple began and construction was completed in 1969. The temple was officially dedicated on November 27,1969 with all Buddhist Ministers of the Eastern District in attendance, along with twenty-third Monshu Ōtani Kōshō and Lady Yoshiko Ōtani.

In 1983 the temple was incorporated as a nonprofit organization. 1986 saw the addition of a residential home for the presiding sensei. A meditation garden was constructed in 1988.

Outreach
The temple served as host for the 2016 Eastern Buddhist League Conference entitled "Come As You Are: Buddhism and Daily Life." The keynote speaker was Kenneth K. Tanaka.

The temple serves as the headquarters for the taiko drumming troupe Hoh Daiko and Seabrook Minyo Dance Group

See Also

References

External links
Seabrook Buddhist Temple
Facebook page
Instagram

20th-century Buddhist temples
Buddhist temples in New Jersey
Religious buildings and structures in Cumberland County, New Jersey
Japanese-American culture in New Jersey
Upper Deerfield Township, New Jersey
Buddhist Churches of America
Shinshū Honganji-ha temples